Blas García Montero (born 8 December 1995) is an Argentine professional footballer who plays as a defender.

Career
García Montero began with the Argentino de Rojas academy, before joining Almirante Brown. He was selected thirty-three times for the Primera B Metropolitana team in his opening four campaigns, including for his professional bow on 18 September 2015 during a 2–2 home draw with Deportivo Merlo. In 2018–19, García Montero scored his first goal versus UAI Urquiza on 12 December 2018. He left in June 2019.

Career statistics
.

References

External links

1995 births
Living people
Sportspeople from Buenos Aires Province
Argentine footballers
Association football defenders
Primera B Metropolitana players
Club Almirante Brown footballers